The 1974 North Texas State Mean Green football team was an American football team that represented North Texas State University (now known as the University of North Texas) during the 1974 NCAA Division I football season as a member of the Missouri Valley Conference. In their second year under head coach Hayden Fry, the team compiled a 2–7–2 record.

Schedule

References

North Texas State
North Texas Mean Green football seasons
North Texas State Mean Green football